Basti may refer to:

People

Surname 
Básti, a Hungarian surname

Given name 
Abderraouf El Basti (born 1947), Tunisian politician
Basti Vaman Shenoy (born 1934), Indian Kolkani activist
Yagi Basti (died  1344), a ruler of Shiraz, Iran
Basti Vaman Shenoy, a noted Konkani Activist and Founder of World Konkani Centre in Mangalore (born 1934)
Ryan Bastinac (born 1991), Australian rules footballer nicknamed "Basti"

Basti, a variant of the male given name Sebastian

Places

India

Uttar Pradesh 
Basti division
Basti district part of Basti division
Basti (Lok Sabha constituency)
Basti, Uttar Pradesh, a city in Basti district
Basti railway station, the main railway station of Basti district

Iran 
Basti, Iran, a village in Markazi Province, Iran

Nepal 
Basti, Nepal
Nirmal Basti, a Village Development Committee in Parsa District in the Narayani Zone of southern Nepal

Pakistan 
Azam Basti, one of the neighbourhoods of Jamshed Town in Karachi, Sindh, Pakistan
Basti Babbar, a town of Bahawalpur District in the Punjab province of eastern Pakistan
Basti Dhandlah, a town of Bahawalpur District in the Punjab province of eastern Pakistan
Basti Fauja, a town and Union Council of Dera Ghazi Khan District in the Punjab province of Pakistan
Basti Malana, a town and Union Council of Dera Ghazi Khan District in the Punjab province of Pakistan
Basti Maluk, town of Multan District, Punjab, Pakistan
Basti Mian Ahmed Din, a village in Tehsil Ahmed Pur Sial District, Jhang, Punjab, Pakistan
Basti Nari, a town of Bahawalpur District in the Punjab province of eastern Pakistan
Khuda Ki Basti (Karachi), one of the neighbourhoods of Gadap Town in Karachi, Sindh, Pakistan
Noorani Basti, one of the neighbourhoods of Hyderabad, Sindh, Pakistan

Spain 
Basti, Granada, a Roman town

Yoga 
Basti (Panchakarma), one of the kriya of Panchakarma cleansing of body according to Ayurveda
Basti (Hatha Yoga), an important part of Shatkarma (sometimes known as Shatkriya), the yogic system of body cleansing techniques

Other uses
Basti or Basadi, a term used in some places for a Jain temple
 Khuda Ki Basti (novel), an Urdu novel written by author Shaukat Siddiqui
Al Basti, a tormenting feminine night-demon in Turkish folklore (Anatolia, Turkmenistan)
Badnam Basti, a 1971 Bollywood drama film directed by Prem Kapoor
Basti (film), a 2003 Indian crime film
Bastian Schweinsteiger, German footballer